Delph is a rural locality in Alberta, Canada.

Delph derives its name from the Hiberno-English term for dishware.

References 

Localities in Lamont County